Lahimia ("carnivore") is an extinct genus of hyaenodont mammals in family Boualitomidae, known from the Selandian stage (middle Paleocene) of Morocco. Lahimia selloumi is the one of the oldest known members of order Hyaenodonta.

Phylogeny
The phylogenetic relationships of genus Lahimia are shown in the following cladogram.

See also
 Mammal classification
 Boualitomidae

References

Hyaenodonts
Paleocene mammals
Paleocene mammals of Africa
Fossils of Morocco
Fossil taxa described in 2009
Prehistoric placental genera